Mrs. William Bechtel (born Jennie Cecilia Ahlstrom) was an American actress active during Hollywood's silent era. She was married to German actor William Bechtel, and she appeared in nearly 100 short films between 1911 and 1916. The pair had no children.

Selected filmography 

 The Quest of Life (1916)
 The Purple Lady (1916)
 The Diamond Crown (1913) 
 The Evil Thereof (1913) 
 A Christmas Accident (1912) 
 The Land Beyond the Sunset (1912) 
 Kitty at Boarding School (1912)
 A Fresh Air Romance (1912) 
 Hearts and Diamonds (1912)

References 

American film actresses
1861 births
1938 deaths